The Halls Mill Covered Bridge is an historic, wooden covered bridge which is located in Hopewell Township in Bedford County, Pennsylvania. 

It was listed on the National Register of Historic Places in 1980.

History and architectural features
It crosses Yellow Creek, and is one of fifteen historic covered bridges in Bedford County.

It was listed on the National Register of Historic Places in 1980.

References 

Covered bridges on the National Register of Historic Places in Pennsylvania
Covered bridges in Bedford County, Pennsylvania
Bridges completed in 1872
Wooden bridges in Pennsylvania
Bridges in Bedford County, Pennsylvania
National Register of Historic Places in Bedford County, Pennsylvania
Road bridges on the National Register of Historic Places in Pennsylvania
Burr Truss bridges in the United States